"T.O.N.Y. (Top of New York)" is the second single from Capone-N-Noreaga's debut album The War Report. It was released on February 11, 1997. The song features Tragedy Khadafi. The song became a critical and commercial success peaking at number 56 on the Hot R&B/Hip-Hop Singles & Tracks and number 16 on the Hot Rap Singles. The song samples "Speak Her Name" by Walter Jackson.

Music video
A music video was released for this song directed by Nick Quested. The music video sees Noreaga and Tragedy rescuing Capone from being sentenced in court.

Charts

References

1996 songs
1997 singles
Capone-N-Noreaga songs
Tragedy Khadafi songs
Songs written by N.O.R.E.